Stephen Nicholas Warman (born 24 August 1967) is a former English cricketer.  Warman was a right-handed batsman.  He was born in Lincoln, Lincolnshire.

Warman made his debut for Lincolnshire in the 1987 Minor Counties Championship against Staffordshire.  Warman played Minor counties cricket for Lincolnshire from 1987 to 2001, which included 100 Minor Counties Championship matches and 24 MCCA Knockout Trophy matches.  He made his List A debut against Gloucestershire in the 1990 NatWest Trophy.  He played 8 further List A matches for Lincolnshire, the last coming against Berkshire in the 1st round of the 2002 Cheltenham & Gloucester Trophy, which was held in 2001.  In his 9 matches, he scored 195 runs at an average of 24.37, with a high score of 39.

References

External links
Stephen Warman at ESPNcricinfo
Stephen Warman at CricketArchive

1967 births
Living people
Cricketers from Lincoln, England
English cricketers
Lincolnshire cricketers